George Hughes (born December 27, 1988) is an American professional ice hockey defenceman. He is currently an unrestricted free agent who last played with the Bakersfield Condors of the ECHL.

Hughes played college hockey with the St. Lawrence Saints in the NCAA Men's Division I ECAC Hockey conference. In his senior year, Hughes's outstanding play was rewarded with a selection to the 2012-13 CCHA All-Conference First Team. He made his professional debut at the end of the 2012–13 season with the San Antonio Rampage of the American Hockey League.

On August 20, 2014, Hughes signed to return with the Bakersfield Condors, however failed to appear in a game for the 2014–15 season.

Awards and honors

References

External links 

1988 births
Living people
Bakersfield Condors (1998–2015) players
San Antonio Rampage players
St. Lawrence Saints men's ice hockey players
American men's ice hockey defensemen
AHCA Division I men's ice hockey All-Americans